Propnight is a survival horror online multiplayer game with Prop Hunt-style mechanics developed by Fntastic and published by Mytona. It was released on Steam in November 2021. It is a one-versus-four game, similar in nature to Dead by Daylight, in which one player takes on the role of a killer and the other four play as survivors with the ability to turn into objects. Propnight held a PC open beta on Steam between October 15 and October 18. The game has been officially released on PC on November 30, 2021. There are presently no plans to release the games on consoles.

Story 

The game's plot is left deliberately mysterious, with the only detail given outside of the game being that "In a small provincial town, teenagers continue to disappear mysteriously." In an interview, Anna Vasilieva, the communication director of Fntastic, explained that Propnight "has its own mysterious lore, and we happily thought of a lot of little things that can be noticed while playing the game. I would not want to take away from the players the pleasure of building theories and guessing about everything for themselves."

Gameplay 
Propnight is a 4v1 asymmetrical horror game. Four players play as Survivors, with the fifth player playing as the Killer. The Survivors' objective is for at least one Survivor to escape the map. To do so, the Survivors must repair 5 of the 7 machines placed across the map, which in turn opens the map's exit. The Killer's objective is either to kill all 4 survivors, or prevent their escape. To catch a Survivor, the killer must knock them down, then place them on a chair, where they will die if not rescued by another Survivor. Each survivor can only be rescued in this way twice; the survivor will die instantly if the survivor is placed on the chair a third time. In the game, survivors could transform into a nearby prop in order to evade the killer.

Development 
Propnight was developed using the Unreal game engine. After an open beta period which ran between October 15 and October 18, 2021, the game was released through Steam on November 30, 2021. It has support for 15 languages, including English, French, Italian, German, Spanish (Spain), Portuguese (Brazil), Spanish (Latin America), Polish, Russian, Swedish, Traditional Chinese, Simplified Chinese, Korean, and Japanese for the interface and subtitles.

Reception 

Aron Poter of NME wrote that while Propnight's premise "takes a while to get used to", he described it as "a fun spin on the established concept that knows how to make the action tense, challenging, and never without several hysterical moments thanks to the core prop copying mechanic

Some reviewers also criticised the game's various technical issues at launch. Rhett Roxl of Sirius Gaming in particular criticised the game's "very poor" implementation of motion blur and its inconsistent framerate, which according to him, "worsens immensely during intense moments."

See also 
The Day Before, Fntastic's next game

References

External links 
 

2021 video games
2020s horror video games
Indie video games
Survival video games
Windows games
Windows-only games
Multiplayer video games
Shapeshifter characters in video games
Unreal Engine games
Video games developed in Russia
Works about serial killers